Nowa Mała Wieś  is a village in the administrative district of Gmina Leoncin, within Nowy Dwór County, Masovian Voivodeship, in east-central Poland.

Village had population of 192 in 2012, which show migration -1, from 2001 - 193.

In the village exists at least one wooden house, which is material remain on the activities of the Dutchman immigration to Poland. Nearby located is voivodeship road, number 575.

References

Villages in Nowy Dwór Mazowiecki County